The Efteling Steam Train Company is a  narrow gauge passenger railway line at the Efteling theme park, in the Netherlands.

History

The line was constructed in 1968 using Second-hand Cockerill rails in a U-shaped track around the park with a station at each end. It opened to the public for the first time in March 1969. Both stations had a wye or rail triangle enabling the locomotives to run chimney-first at all times.
Nowadays, the line has stations located in the Adventure and Fairy realms, plus one station for the fairy characters to board.

Locomotives

Aagje (1911): The first locomotive bought, 'Aagje' an Orenstein & Koppel, was, at that time, still in operation at the IJsseloord Brickworks in Arnhem. Aagje started her ‘fairy duty’ in 1969.
Moortje (1908): After hard labor in a Belgian coalmine she became operational in the Efteling in 1974
Neefje (1914): Originally a fireless steam locomotive. Operational in the Efteling in 1979- retired 2001. This particular locomotive is named after Kees Neve, who rebuilt and delivered Aagje, Moortje and Neefje for The Efteling. He was a well-known person among Dutch narrow gauge enthusiasts.
Trijntje (1992): Built by Alan Keef, operational in the Efteling in 1992.
A Diepholzer Maschinenfabrik Fritz Schöttler (Diema) (German locomotive manufacturer) diesel locomotive for maintenance purposes.
Each locomotive pulls six carriages which were designed by Anton Pieck. He also designed the locomotive tenders, not an original feature on this type of small locomotives.

See also

Narrow-gauge railways in the Netherlands
Rail transport in Walt Disney Parks and Resorts

References

External links

600 mm gauge railways in the Netherlands
Dutch culture
Efteling
Heritage railways in the Netherlands
Railways of amusement parks in the Netherlands